The National Museum of Myanmar (Naypyidaw) is a modern museum located near the Kumudra circle, in Ottarathiri Township, Naypyidaw, Myanmar (Burma). Besides the older National Museum of Myanmar in Yangon, it is the second of the two national museums for Burmese art, history and culture in Myanmar.

The construction of the museum was started on 3 June 2010, and the museum was opened on 15 July 2015. - The museum is open from 9:30 am to 4:30 pm, except on Mondays and public holidays.

Objectives and major tasks 
The objectives of the National Museum (Naypyidaw) are:

To elucidate the country's rich and advanced cultural heritage;
To showcase a high standing of national honor;
To elaborate natural soft power achievement;
To show systematic and competent management with a spectacular modern touch, reflecting the national pride and prestige of the country

Moreover, the National Museum's major tasks are the following:

Collection of museum objects
Preservation and conservation of museum objects
Research and publications
Object displays and exhibitions (permanent and temporary)
Public education and public relations for the purpose of community engagement

Galleries 

Primates and Fossils Exhibition Room 
This exhibition room displays fossils of Pondaung formation, petrified plants found in Pondaung formation and Irrawaddy sedimentary formation. The display highlights the fact that Myanmar civilization developed uninterruptedly and Myanmar is one of the original places of homo sapiens. Anthropologist the world over agree that Myanmar's humanoid primate display at the exhibition room is one of the most preeminent collection of anthropoid primates.

Prehistoric Period Exhibition Room 
In this exhibition room, tools, weapons and utensils from Myanmar Stone Age, Bronze Age and Iron Age are displayed. Miniature replicas of Padah-Lin Caves are displayed with supporting special lighting and models. The center piece of the display is a miniature replica of the Bronze Age excavation site, with supporting objects, such as pots, urns, beads and bronze weapons.

Protohistoric Period Exhibition Room 

Small scale models and architectural elements of UNESCO's World Heritage listed Halin, Beikthano and Sri Ksetra Pyu cities and other early Myanmar city states from all over the country are on show in this room. Moreover, five Pyu figurines, as well as gold, silver, bronze and earthen artifacts from excavated sites are displayed in this exhibition room.

Historic Period Exhibition Room 
In this exhibition room, miniature replicas of religious structures, architecture, cultural artifacts and religious objects are displayed. The center piece of the display is Bagan architecture, showing religious buildings, wall paintings, frescoes, masonry and ceramic works.

Lion Throne Exhibition Room 
This large hall is dedicated to a complete replica of the only existing Lion Throne of the kings of Burma, along with replicas of royal as well as non-royal regalia.

Myanmar Art Gallery 
The display of Myanmar paintings includes old traditional paintings, wall paintings of successive eras, Jataka epic paintings and masterpieces of important artists. It is divided into old genre paintings, classic, modern and contemporary paintings.

Myanmar Performing Arts Exhibition Room 
This exhibition room displays Myanmar dramatic art, a Myanmar traditional orchestra and a miniature theatre stage according to tradition. Myanmar traditional musical instruments, and various musical instruments of Kachin, Kayah, Kayin, Chin, Bama, Mon, Rakhine and Shan national ethnic groups are also displayed.

Arts and Crafts Exhibition Room 
This room focuses on traditional arts and crafts, such as artistic gold or silver smithing, bronze casting, masonry and bricklaying, making sculptures of stone, metal or wood, as well as painting and lacquerware.

ASEAN Exhibition Rooom 
Displays of traditional costumes, musical instruments, landmarks and other items of ASEAN countries

Children Discovery Exhibition Room 
Natural history, Myanmar history and cultural activities such as traditional games and festivals are exhibited for children.

See also 

 National Museum of Myanmar in Yangon
 List of museums in Myanmar

References 

National museums
Museums in Myanmar
Buildings and structures in Naypyidaw
Museums established in 2015